Roger Lee Trott (born 25 June 1963 in Paget, Bermuda) is a former Bermudian cricketer. He played five List A matches for Bermuda in the 1996 Red Stripe Bowl, and also represented them in the 1997 ICC Trophy.

References

External links
Cricket Archive profile
Cricinfo profile

1963 births
Living people
Bermudian cricketers
People from Paget Parish
Wicket-keepers